Stratton railway station served the village of Stratton St Margaret, in the historic county of Wiltshire, England, from 1883 to 1953 on the Highworth branch line.

History
The station was opened on 9 May 1883 by the Great Western Railway. It closed to passengers on 2 March 1953, although it was still used by employees of Swindon Works until 3 August 1962. Nothing remains.

References

Disused railway stations in Wiltshire
Former Great Western Railway stations
Railway stations in Great Britain opened in 1883
Railway stations in Great Britain closed in 1953
1883 establishments in England
1962 disestablishments in England